Dame Catherine Elizabeth Bingham  (born 19 October 1965), known as Kate Bingham, is a British venture capitalist. She is a managing partner at a venture capital firm, SV Health Investors.

In 2020, Bingham chaired the UK Government's Vaccine Taskforce, steering procurement of vaccines and the strategy for their deployment during the COVID-19 pandemic.

Early life and education
Kate Bingham was born in London, the only daughter of the barrister and judge Tom Bingham (later Lord Bingham of Cornhill) and Elizabeth ( Loxley) and the eldest of their three children. She attended St Paul's Girls' School, London, before going on to study at Christ Church, Oxford, where she graduated with a first-class degree in Biochemistry (MA).

Bingham then pursued further studies at Harvard Business School, taking the degree of MBA.

Career
Bingham worked in business development for Vertex Pharmaceuticals and consultants Monitor Company before joining Schroder Ventures in 1991 (now SV Health Investments). She became a managing partner specializing in biotechnology, and has served on the boards of companies in the UK, US, Ireland, Sweden and Germany, including Autifony Therapeutics, Bicycle Therapeutics (named for their specialism in bicyclic peptides), Mestag Therapeutics, Pulmocide, Sitryx, and Zarodex Therapeutics.

As of January 2021 she is listed as being a director of the following active companies: Mestag Therapeutics Ltd; Cybele Therapeutics Ltd; Bicycle tx Ltd; Bicycle Therapeutics plc; Sitryx Therapeutics Ltd; Pulmocide Ltd; Autifony Therapeutics Ltd; Bicycle RD Ltd; SV Health Investors Ltd (whose subsidiaries include the Dementia Discovery Fund); and SCV Health Managers LLP.

She is also a Trustee of the Francis Crick Institute.

HM Government appointment 
In May 2020, Bingham was appointed Chair of the UK Vaccine Taskforce, without a recruitment process. The Taskforce was set up to manage the path towards the introduction of a COVID-19 vaccine in the UK and its global distribution. In this temporary unpaid role, which finished at the end of the year, she reported to the prime minister. In October, she was one of the participants in a trial of a vaccine by Novavax. According to leaked documents seen by The Sunday Times, Bingham charged taxpayers £670,000 for a team of eight full-time boutique consultants from London PR agency Admiral Associates.

Dame Kate's work on the UK's vaccination rollout programme has been praised by scientists and international media, particularly for securing 350 million doses of six vaccines and setting up infrastructure for clinical trials, manufacturing and distribution.

Honours
In January 2017, Bingham received the Lifetime Achievement Award of the BioIndustry Association UK.

Appointed Dame Commander of the Order of the British Empire (DBE) in the 2021 Birthday Honours for "services to the procurement, manufacture and distribution of Covid-19 vaccines", Bingham was also admitted to the Freedom of the City of London in that year.

Personal life
Bingham married Jesse Norman in 1992; the couple have two sons and a daughter. Norman was elected as the Conservative Member of Parliament for Hereford and South Herefordshire in 2010. He was Financial Secretary to the Treasury in the administrations of Theresa May and Boris Johnson from 2019 until 2021. They live near Builth Wells in the Brecon Beacons. Bingham went to school with Boris Johnson's sister, Rachel Johnson.

References

External links
 

1965 births
Living people
Alumni of Christ Church, Oxford
British biochemists
British businesspeople
British women biochemists
Dames Commander of the Order of the British Empire
Daughters of life peers
English people of Northern Ireland descent
Francis Crick Institute
People educated at St Paul's Girls' School
People from London
Harvard Business School alumni
Kennedy Scholarships
Venture capitalists